New Pants is a Chinese rock band. Established in 1996, New Pants has become one of the most representative bands influenced by new wave in China. Current band members are: Peng Lei (vocals), Pang Kuan (keyboard), Zhao Meng (bass) and Hayato Kitō (drums).

In 2019, New Pants participated in a variety show called "The Big Band" on iQiyi and won the championship (Hot 1). In 2020, a version of their song "Do You Want To Dance? 你要跳舞吗" was featured in the music program called "We Are Blazing 炙热的我们 2020," performed by SNH48 Group.

Discography
Albums:

 1998 新裤子 (New Pants)
 2000 Disco Girl
 2002 我们是自动的 (We Are Automatic)
 2006 龙虎人丹 (Dragon Tiger Panacea)
 2008 野人也有爱 (Equal Love)
 2009 Go East
 2011 SEX DRUGS INTERNET
 2016 生命因你而火热 (Life’s Hot Because of You)
 2021 爱 广播 飞机 (Love, Broadcast, Aircraft)

MV

 New Pants 新裤子 - SEX DRUGS INTERNET

References

Chinese rock music groups
Low Transit Industries artists